Alyson Avenue is a melodic rock band from Helsingborg, Sweden. The band was formed by keyboardist Niclas Olsson along with then bassist Thomas Lyöskä, the band was originally fronted by a male vocalist until 1995 when back-up singer Anette Olzon became a permanent member and lead vocalist.

Their musical style is described as AOR and melodic rock.

History
Alyson Avenue was formed in 1989 by a couple of friends who intended to play melodic rock in the way Treat and Europe amongst others did. At that time Alyson Avenue had a male vocalist.

Anette Olzon was taken in to the band as a back-up singer, but did a great job on a demo recording, and then became a permanent member soon after the band was founded. With a female vocalist, the band's sound was to be compared with that of Heart and Robin Beck. Their music drifted towards a much more "poppier" sound for a while, but at the rehearsals, the band was only heard playing everything from hard rock to even soul. When playing live, however, Alyson Avenue always had concentrated to perform AOR/hard rock only.

In 1995, the main discussion was in what direction the band should go. Some demos with melodic rock had been recorded over the years, and as people obviously liked it, they decided to stay with it.

In 1999, the band sent out a demo to the press, and gained huge feedback for their sound. With a little help by the Belgian melodic rock-orientated magazine "Rock Report", Alyson Avenue found the right contacts to some labels. Unfortunately, not much happened, but the band got together to record another new 4-track demo, which finally resulted in a record deal with AOR Heaven.

Their debut album, "Presence of Mind", was released in November 2000, and the interest and reviews were far beyond the band's expectations, including a 93/100 rating in Japanese magazine "Burrn!" which was followed by massive sales.

In 2003, a little more than 3 years later, Alyson Avenue released a new album titled "Omega".

In 2007, Alyson Avenue had slowed down a bit, so when Nightwish went public with the information that they looked for a new lead vocalist, Olzon decided to make a go of it. Some of the members of Alyson Avenue helped Olzon with the demo recordings.

After Olzon's departure to Nightwish, the rest of the Band toyed with the idea of starting a new male fronted AOR-band, but those ideas where eventually scrapped and the search of a new female vocalist started.

In 2009, Arabella Vitanc joined the band on lead vocals, giving the band new energy to start the work on the 3rd Alyson Avenue record.

On 10 June 2011, Alyson Avenue released their third album "Changes" through Avenue of Allies. The record was co-produced by the band members and Chris Laney (Crazy Lixx, H.E.A.T, Brian Robertson) and included guest appearances by Olzon, Michael Bormann (Ex-Jaded Heart, Charade, BISS), Rob Marcello (Danger Danger, Marcello – Vestry), Fredrik Bergh (Street Talk, Bloodbound), Tommy Stråhle and Mike Andersson (Cloudscape, Planet Alliance).

On 4 June 2012, Alyson Avenue announced that they were back in the studio writing songs for their 4th album, and promised an album full of hooks in true AOR/melodic rock style.

On 27 October 2013, the band announced on their Facebook "[...] that there will be no more albums by Alyson Avenue. The spark just isn´t there anymore." The band members are moving to their own new projects.

In 2015 Anette and Niclas joined for songwriting in the vein of the first release but there were no plans for a full album or a full lineup. Still, they re-recorded a song from their first album ("Without Your Love") for its 25th anniversary.

In 2018 Alyson Avenue played at Melodicrockfest Scandinavia in Malmö in early June, with almost the original lineup (bass player Christer Engholm replaced retired Thomas Löyskä). During the performance, Anette Olzon said that the band is back and now has more fun than ever, so a new record might come in the future. By then the band also re-released the first 2 records, as the copyrights has fallen back to themselves. The band is currently without a new record-label.

Members

Current members
 Niclas Olsson – keyboards, backing vocals (1989–present)
 Anette Olzon - Vocals (1995–2007; 2015–present; session member: 1995)
 Fredrik Eriksson – drums b-vocals (2005–present)
 Tony Rothla – guitars (2005–present; session member: 2000, 2004)
 Christer Engholm; bass, b-vocals (2018–present)

Former members
 Tommy Strahle – vocals (1989–1995)
 Jarmo Piironen – guitars (1997–2004)
 Roger Landin – drums (1997–2004)
 Thomas Löyskä – bass (1989–2012)
 Arabella Vitanc – vocals (2009–2013)
 Mikey K. Nilsson – guitars (2011–2013)
 Göran Forssén – bass (2012–2013)

Former session members
 Patrick Svärd (now in Cloudscape) - guitars (2000)
 Christofer Dahlman – guitars (2000–2005)

Timeline

Discography

Studio albums
 Presence of Mind (2000; 2009 re-release; 2018 re-release) (Japan #93, Burn Magazine)
 Omega (2002; 2009 re-release; 2018 re-release)
 Changes (2011)

Singles
 I Am (Your Pleasuremaker) (2004)
 Without Your Love (Anniversary Version)(2015)

References

External links
 Alyson Avenue Official Site

Swedish musical groups
Musical groups established in 1999
1999 establishments in Sweden